The 2022–23 season is the 86th season in the existence of Colchester United Football Club and the club's seventh consecutive season in League Two. In addition to the league, they will also compete in the 2022–23 FA Cup, the 2022–23 EFL Cup and the 2022–23 EFL Trophy.

Transfers

In

Out

Loans in

Loans out

Pre-season and friendlies
A match with Potters Bar Town was confirmed on 20 May. The U's announced their first pre-season friendly against Southend United at home. On June 10, Colchester revealed three more pre-season matches. A behind-closed-doors friendly with Reading was next to be confirmed. A further home friendly against Charlton Athletic was added to the schedule in July. Wayne Brown would also take an XI side to face Chelmsford City.

Competitions

Overall record

League Two

League table

Results summary

Results by round

Matches

On 23 June, the league fixtures were announced.

FA Cup

The U's were drawn away to Newport County in the first round.

EFL Cup

Colchester were drawn away to Ipswich Town in the first round and at home to Brentford in the second round.

EFL Trophy

On 21 June, the initial group stage draw was made, grouping Colchester United with Charlton Athletic and Gillingham. Three days later, Brighton & Hove Albion U21s joined Southern Group A. In the second round, Colchester were drawn at home to Bristol Rovers.

See also
List of Colchester United F.C. seasons

References

2022-23
2022–23 EFL League Two by team